Gymnosoma desertorum is a Palaearctic species of fly in the family Tachinidae.

References

Phasiinae
Diptera of Europe
Diptera of Asia
Insects described in 1947
Taxa named by Boris Rohdendorf